Otis Kermit Rice (June 6, 1919 – September 22, 2003) was an American academic historian specializing in West Virginia history. His career was mostly at the West Virginia Institute of Technology (1957–87) at Montgomery where he was chairman of the history department and dean of the School of Human Studies. In 2003 he became West Virginia’s first Historian Laureate.

Works

Books
The Allegheny Frontier: West Virginia Beginnings, 1730-1830 (1970), University of Kentucky Press
Charleston and the Kanawha Valley: An Illustrated History (1981), Woodland Hills, California: Windsor Publications 
The Hatfields and the McCoys (1982), University Press of Kentucky
History of the New River Gorge Area (1984), West Virginia Institute of Technology 
West Virginia: A History (1985; 2nd edition 1993; with Stephen W. Brown), Both editions: University Press of Kentucky
A History of Greenbrier County (1986), Greenbrier Historical Society 
Sheltering Arms Hospital (with Wayne Williams) 
The Mountain State: An Introduction to West Virginia
A Centennial of Strength: A History of Banking in West Virginia (1991), Charleston: West Virginia Bankers Association; (with Stephen W. Brown)
Frontier Kentucky (1993), University Press of Kentucky
West Virginia: The State and Its People (1997), Parsons, West Virginia: McClain Printing Company

Monographs
"Importations of Cattle into Kentucky, 1790-1830" (1951), Register of the Kentucky Historical Society; 49: 35-47.
"The Sandy Creek Expedition of 1756" (1951), West Virginia History; 13: 5-19.
"West Virginia Printers and Their Work, 1790-1830" (1953), West Virginia History; 14: 297-338.
"Coal Mining in the Kanawha Valley to 1861: A View of Industrialization in the Old South" (1965), Journal of Southern History; 31: 393-416 (November issue).
"Eli Thayer and the Friendly Invasion of Virginia" (1971), Journal of Southern History; 37: 575-96.

References

1919 births
2003 deaths
West Virginia University Institute of Technology faculty
Historians of Virginia
Historians of West Virginia
People from Montgomery, West Virginia
Writers from West Virginia
20th-century American educators